A series of referendums on the legislature and taxes were held in American Samoa on 3 November 1970 alongside general elections.  Voters were asked to approve a measure streamlining the spending of money obtained from taxes and duties, a ban on government employees or public officers running for the legislature while they held those positions, a measure setting the term of the Fono as two 30-day sessions per year and another capping MP salaries at six thousand dollars per year.  All these measures passed and were adopted into law.

References

Referendums in American Samoa
1970 in American Samoa